Petticoating or pinaforing is a type of forced feminization that involves dressing a man or boy in girls' clothing as a form of humiliation or punishment, or as a fetish.  While the practice has come to be a rare, socially unacceptable form of humiliating punishment, it has risen up as both a subgenre of erotic literature or other expression of sexual fantasy.

There is some evidence that "petticoat punishment" has occasionally been used as a form of child discipline, with credible stories of such going back at least to Victorian times.  "Petticoat punishment", as a sexual fetish interest, involves imagining or reenacting this scenario. However, as a fetish interest, these activities are usually heavily exaggerated and sexualized, including elaborate humiliation and public nudity. They often involve the male being feminized into a sissy by a powerful female presence (often a mother or aunt) in front of his cousins, sisters, or in some cases, girls of his own age whom he had offended by his boorish behavior.

Petticoating roleplay may include being forced to wear makeup and to carry dolls, purses, and other items associated with girls. 

Petticoat discipline also occurs in the context of some marital relationships, as a means by which a wife may exert control over her husband. This may involve various items of feminine clothing or underwear in a variety of contexts, ranging from the husband having to wear a feminine apron around the house whilst performing household chores, to the wife insisting that the husband wear lingerie under ordinary male clothing. In all such circumstances, there is a strong reliance on the element of humiliation, whether actual or potential, should the husband's secret be discovered.

Techniques 

This fantasy and sexual roleplay involves a male being forced to wear female clothing, under threat of corporal punishment, public humiliation or another erotic humiliation activity. Afterwards, the victim sometimes finds out that they actually enjoy such punishment, and becomes more "feminine," polite and controllable. He is then often forced to wear an article of girl's clothing permanently until a certain age, or until a role-play scenario is finished.

Often, there are specific themes for said petticoating. Often, petticoating revolves around the "little girl" aspect in which the submissive/child is forced to act like a little girl. Other scenarios include infantilism and sissy maid.

Clothing considered female include a bra, panties, tights, stockings, corset, petticoat, pinafore (often in the style of a French maid), dress (often extremely short or revealing, often with lock), skirt (often a mini/micro skirt), shoes (often Mary Janes or heels), etc. Other items include nail polish, choker (close fitting necklace), etc.

Political incorrectness 
Stella Gonzalez-Arnal of the Department of Philosophy at the University of Hull sees pinaforing as a "politically incorrect form of sexuality" in which "women's clothing and women's traditional occupations" are regarded "as inferior and humiliating; reinforcing undesirable stereotypes by characterising females as submissive, passive, helpless and subservient." She adds "I will argue that petticoating is a politically ambiguous form of sexuality which can have positive readings. I claim that it can be educational and therapeutical and that it can subvert our notions of masculinity and femininity."

Literary accounts 
A number of erotic novels of the Victorian period contain accounts of pinaforing.

In Gynecocracy:  A Narrative of the Adventures and Psychological Experiences of Julian Robinson, by "Viscount Ladywood" (1893), the author recounts his punishment as a boy at the hands of the governmess to whom he is sent, along with three female cousins, after taking indecent liberties with a household maid. Forced to wear girls' clothing as his ordinary attire, Julian, as Julia, is subjected to frequent flagellations, as are his cousins, one of whom he later marries, submitting to her dominance through continued forced feminization and crossdressing.

The Victorian classic, My Secret Life by "Walter" (1888), contains an account of pinaforing in which the main character, Walter, witnesses the birching of a wealthy middle-aged man by a prostitute while the man wears feminine attire.

The Pearl,  A Journal of Facetiae and Voluptuous Reading (1879–1880), a Victorian pornographic magazine, also contains an account of the flagellation of a victim dressed as a woman, although, in the strict sense, this account does not represent pinaforing per se because the man, Frank, is not petticoated as part of his punishment but has, rather, dressed in ladies' garments to disguise himself as a woman: to avenge herself, Lucretia persuades Frank to pose as his sister and to join a ladies' private whipping club, the qualification for admission to which is the applicant's receipt of a whipping.

See also
Feminization
Male submission

References

Cross-dressing
Paraphilias
Sexual fetishism
Sexual roleplay